Island of the Lost is a 1967 American adventure film directed by John Florea and starring Richard Greene, Luke Halpin and Irene Tsu. It was shot on location in The Bahamas and Palm Beach Gardens in Florida.

Plot
An anthropologist and his family are shipwrecked on a Pacific island inhabited by prehistoric animals.

Cast
 Richard Greene as Josh MacRae 
 Luke Halpin as Stu MacRae 
 Sheilah Wells as Sharon MacRae 
 Irene Tsu as Judy Hawllani 
 Mart Hulswit as Gabe Larsen 
 Robin Mattson as Lizzie MacRae 
 Jose De Vega as Tupuna

References

Bibliography
 Leslie Halliwell. Halliwell's Film Guide. Scribner, 1989.

External links

1967 films
1967 adventure films
American adventure films
Paramount Pictures films
Films directed by John Florea
1960s English-language films
1960s American films